Caldecote or The Caldecotes refers to a pair of hamlets located in Bedfordshire, England:

 Lower Caldecote
 Upper Caldecote

See also
 Caldecote (disambiguation)